Miguel Arenas (1902–1965) was a Spanish film actor. He emigrated to Mexico where he appeared in more than a hundred films.

Selected filmography
 While Mexico Sleeps (1938)
 A Macabre Legacy (1940)
 The Count of Monte Cristo (1942)
 The Two Orphans (1944)
 Michael Strogoff (1944)
 A Day with the Devil (1945)
The Disobedient Son (1945)
 The Lost Child (1947)
 A Galician Dances the Mambo (1951)
 The Martyr of Calvary (1952)
 A Tailored Gentleman (1954)
 The Viscount of Monte Cristo (1954)
 Raffles (1958)
 Chucho el Roto (1960)
 My Mother Is Guilty (1960)

References

External links 
 

1902 births
1965 deaths
Spanish male film actors
Spanish emigrants to Mexico
People from Alicante